The Central Basketball Association (CBA) is a semi-professional men's basketball league that began play in the spring of 2013. The league schedule typically begins in March and ends in May.

History 
The four charter members are Bowling Green Hornets, Middle Tennessee Storm, River City Panthers, St. Louis Hawks (all formerly of the Central Basketball League).

Three teams (Chattanooga Rail Runners, Fort Wayne Flite and Memphis Soul Kings) were added for the 2014 season. After the second CBA season St. Louis Hawks ceased operations. An original member of the league, St. Louis went 10-7 over two regular seasons, capturing the first-ever CBA championship.

For 2015, CBA added three expansion teams: Indianapolis Briks, Mississippi Eagles and Springfield Sentinels.

After the 2015 season Memphis Soul Kings ceased operations. Chattanooga Rail Runners relocated to Memphis. Expansion teams Columbus Condors and Indianapolis Blaze were added for the 2016 season.

Teams

Rail Runners  The first head coach was Rodney English (2014-2015), with the current head coach being Paul Gaffney (2015–present). Gaffney is a 17-year veteran of the Harlem Globetrotters. He founded the Rail Runners as a way to provide local players yet one more opportunity to realize their professional dreams.

Former teams 
 Columbus Condors (2016)
 Illinois Coal Miners (2017)
 Indianapolis Briks (2015)
 Memphis Soul Kings (2014)
 Peoria Panthers (2013)
 Springfield Sentinels (2015)
 St. Louis Hawks (2013)
 Washington Stars (2017)

Champions

References

External links 
 Official CBA website
 @playCBA

Basketball leagues in the United States